Vagner Antônio Brandalise (born 3 June 1989), simply known as Vagner, is a Brazilian footballer who plays as a goalkeeper for Chapecoense.

Club career
Born in Bom Sucesso do Sul, Paraná, Vagner graduated with Paulista's youth setup. He made his senior debut on 1 February, starting in a 4–1 home routing over Guaratinguetá for the Campeonato Paulista championship.

After loans at Vila Nova and Criciúma, Vagner joined Ituano on 8 November 2012. He appeared regularly for the side, being a starter during the club's Paulistão winning campaign.

On 17 April 2014 Vagner signed for Avaí. On 22 December, after appearing in 36 matches and being promoted to Série A, he renewed his link with the club.

On 10 December 2015, after his side was immediately relegated back to the second tier, Vagner signed a four-year deal with Palmeiras.

Honours
Ituano
Campeonato Paulista: 2014

Palmeiras
Campeonato Brasileiro Série A: 2016

Chapecoense
Campeonato Catarinense: 2020
Campeonato Brasileiro Série B: 2020

References

External links

1989 births
Living people
Sportspeople from Paraná (state)
Brazilian footballers
Association football goalkeepers
Campeonato Brasileiro Série A players
Campeonato Brasileiro Série B players
Paulista Futebol Clube players
Vila Nova Futebol Clube players
Criciúma Esporte Clube players
Ituano FC players
Avaí FC players
Sociedade Esportiva Palmeiras players
Mirassol Futebol Clube players
Guarani FC players
Londrina Esporte Clube players
Grêmio Novorizontino players
Associação Chapecoense de Futebol players